Northgate Junior – Senior High School is a public high school in Pittsburgh, Pennsylvania, United States, serving Northgate School District. It is located in Bellevue, a borough of Allegheny County. The school district is relatively small, consisting of only two elementary schools, one in Avalon, and one in Bellevue. The school combines grades 7-12 into one Junior-Senior High School.

References

Schools in Allegheny County, Pennsylvania
Education in Pittsburgh area
Public high schools in Pennsylvania
Public middle schools in Pennsylvania